The Repository is an American daily local newspaper serving the Canton, Ohio area. It is currently owned by Gannett.

History
Historically, the newspaper had strong Republican connections, most notably with President William McKinley, who was married to Ida Saxton McKinley, the granddaughter of the paper's founder. 
The paper would eventually change its name from The Ohio Repository to The Canton Repository to the current The Repository.
1815- It was founded on March 30, 1815, by John Saxton, starting as a weekly called The Ohio Repository.
1892- The paper began publishing seven days a week. 
1927- Brush-Moore Newspapers purchased The Repository.
1930- The Repository moved into its offices at 500 Market Avenue South, Canton.
1967- Thomson Newspapers purchased Brush-Moore and The Repository.
2000- Copley Press bought the paper in 2000 when Thomson decided to leave the newspaper business. 
2007- In April 2007 it was acquired by GateHouse Media. 
2019- GateHouse Media and Gannett merged.  Gannett Co., Inc. became The Repository's next owner.

The Canton Daily News acquisition

The Repository purchased The Canton Daily News in 1927, the year after the gangland assassination of its editor Don Mellett. Months before it was purchased, The Canton Daily News was awarded the 1927 Pulitzer Prize for Public Service, "for its brave, patriotic and effective fight for the ending of a vicious state of affairs brought about by collusion between city authorities and the criminal element, a fight which had a tragic result in the assassination of the editor of the paper, Mr. Don R. Mellett". Established in 1833 as the Stark County Democrat, The Canton Daily News ceased publication July 3, 1930.

Features and operations

Newsprint Coverage
The Repository newspaper contains daily sections for nation & world, opinion, Stark & Ohio, obituaries, classified ads, sports, advise and comics.  Weekly covered sections, some with inconsistent publication days, are: 
 (varying)- Real estate, home improvements, food & recipes, restaurant & brewery reviews, Faith, entertainment and activities
 Sunday- Births, birthdays, weddings, anniversaries

Internet Expansion 
The company's domain name,  cantonrep.com, was created Oct 31, 1996.  Articles from The Repository are available on-line in a free preview mode or in full view via subscription.

The CantonRep Facebook page, created January 29, 2009, provides full view coverage of selected articles.

Co-Sponsored Community Events
 Best of the Best Reader's Choice Contest and awards ceremony covers 200+ categories of professional services and commerce in the Stark County area.  It is conducted annually by The Repository and sponsored by the Canton Regional Chamber of Commerce.
 Stark County Home and Garden Show; presented annually by The Repository and the Building Industry Association (“BIA”) of Stark County
 Best of Stark Preps high-school athletic awards, Athletes of the Year; presented by The Repository and partners Pro Football Hall of Fame (HOF), Jerzees Sports Grill, Aultman Hospital, Huntington Bank and Kent State University.
 The Canton Repository (HOF Enshrinement) Grand Parade; presented by The Repository.

Sister publications 
The Repository is related to other Northeast Ohio publications, including:
 The Independent of Massillon, a daily
 The Times-Reporter of New Philadelphia, a daily
 The Review of Alliance, a daily
 Calendar of Ohio
 Friday Night Ohio
 The Suburbanite in southern Summit County, a weekly

References

External links
 The Repository website
 The Review website
 Times-Reporter website
 The Independent website
 The Suburbanite website

Newspapers published in Ohio
Publications established in 1815
Culture of Canton, Ohio
Stark County, Ohio
1815 establishments in Ohio
Gannett publications